Gramella aquimixticola is a Gram-negative, non-spore-forming aerobic and motile bacterium from the genus of Gramella which has been isolated from estuary water from Hwajinpo in Korea.

References

Flavobacteria
Bacteria described in 2015